Peter Colligan Graham Donald (born 8 August 1957) is an English former first-class cricketer.

Donald was born at Frenchay in August 1957. He was educated at Sherborne School, before going up to St John's College, Oxford. While studying at Oxford he made a single appearance in first-class cricket for Oxford University against Yorkshire at Oxford in 1978. Batting once in the match, he was dismissed for a single run in the Oxford first-innings by Geoff Cope. He later played minor counties cricket for Wiltshire in 1981 and 1982, making fifteen appearances in the Minor Counties Championship.

References

External links

1957 births
Living people
People from South Gloucestershire District
People educated at Sherborne School
Alumni of St John's College, Oxford
English cricketers
Oxford University cricketers
Wiltshire cricketers